Holbrook is a village in Derbyshire at the southern end of the Pennines around five miles north of Derby, England. The population of the civil parish at the 2011 census was 1,538.

History
Holbrook lies about two miles to the north-east of Duffield, the parish of which it was a part, being within Duffield Frith. When the latter was seized by King Henry III following the rebellion of Robert de Ferrers, 6th Earl of Derby it appears to have been spared. However it became the property of Edmund Crouchback along with the rest of the Frith.  It was sold by the Crown to various local copyholders in the reign of Charles I.  It included the capital messuage, called Cocksbench, or Coxbench Hall.

Coxbench, which is a hamlet just to the south, is supposed to have been the "Herdebi" mentioned in the Domesday Survey, as held under Henry de Ferrers; and the adjoining part of the manor of Horsley is supposed to have been the "Herdebi" held under Ralph de Burun.

In 1863, Holbrook (or Holbrooke) was created as a separate parish from that of Duffield. St Michael's Church, Holbrook is a simple construction in stone built in 1761 by Rev. S. Bradshaw. It was rebuilt and enlarged in 1841 by the MP William Evans.

It was once served by Coxbench railway station on the Midland Railway Ripley Branch.

See also
Listed buildings in Holbrook, Derbyshire

References

External links

Villages in Derbyshire
Civil parishes in Derbyshire
Geography of Amber Valley